Kawabata (written: 川畑, 川端 or 河端) is a Japanese surname. Notable people with the surname include:

, Japanese skier
, Japanese professional wrestler
, Japanese basketball player
, Japanese footballer
, Japanese musician
, Japanese drifting driver
Minoru Kawabata (1911–2001), Japanese artist
, Japanese painter
, Japanese sprinter
, Japanese baseball player
, Japanese baseball player
, Japanese ski jumper
, Japanese baseball player
, Japanese politician
, Japanese cyclist
, Japanese writer

Japanese-language surnames